The zeybek is a form of Turkish folk dance originating from Yörüks particular to Western, Central and southern Anatolia in Turkey. It is named after the Zeybeks.

The dance is hierarchic, with a group of companions performing it while wearing a particular decorative costume and a typical headdress. A Zeybek band has a leader called efe; the inexperienced young men were called kızans. The term efe is presumably the survivor of the Greek word ephebos.

All zeybek dances have a common characteristic form, but the positioning of the arms and body differ according to the different regions. The rhythm is also very characteristic, a pattern of nine slow beats:  = 4 + 4 + 1 beats or 2 + 2 + 2 + 3 with occasional variations.

Zeybek melodies can be divided according to their tempo: ağır (slow) and kıvrak (fast). There is, however, no gezinleme introduction in female zeybek dances.

This dance is popular in Aydin, Izmir, and Denizli.

See also
Afshar
List of dances
List of dances sorted by ethnicity
Music of Turkey
Gabardıç
Zeibekiko

References

Turkish folk dances
Zeybeks
Turkish dances

bg:Зейбекико